Vesdun is a commune in the Cher department in the Centre-Val de Loire region of France.

Geography
The commune shares its southern border with that of the department of Allier. Vesdun is one of seven localities claiming the title of the geographical centre of France (if the coastal islands are included).

Population

Sights

 The church of St. Cyr, dating from the twelfth century
 The chateau of La Cour.
 A preserved sixteenth-century house.

See also
Communes of the Cher department

References

External links

Annuaire Mairie website 

Communes of Cher (department)